Barrio Vila is a train station in Rosario, Santa Fe, Argentina. It is located in the west of the city, in the neighbourhood of Belgrano. The station is currently managed by private company Nuevo Central Argentino which runs freight trains on the line.

History 

The station was opened in April 1891 in the Eloy Palacios town by British-owned Central Argentine Railway, as part of the line from Ludueña (Rosario) to Peyrano (at the border with Buenos Aires Province). The town had been founded by Nicasio Vila, an entrepreneur owner of "Compañía de Tramways del Oeste", a horse tramway company. The tramway company built the line from Rosario with Eloy Palacios.

In 1906, the municipality of Rosario changed the town's name to "Barrio Vila", the same than the railway station built by the Central Argentine.

After the railway nationalization in 1949, the station was managed by the General Bartolomé Mitre Railway division of Ferrocarriles Argentinos.

In 1977 Barrio Vila station was closed, as almost all passenger services were eliminated. Like other stations of the former Mitre Railway, it is maintained nowadays by freight company Nuevo Central Argentino.

Operators 

Notes

References

Railway stations opened in 1891
Railway stations in Rosario, Santa Fe